Associação Atlética de Avanca known as A.A. Avanca is a Portuguese football club from Estarreja, Aveiro. They currently play in the Portuguese Second Division Serie B and in the 2007–08 season they finished 13th place in their division. They currently play their home games in Parque Desportivo da Associação Atlética de Avanca and their home ground has a capacity of 1,500. Their current manager is Fernando Pereira and they do not have a chairman because they have different owners of the club.  Their main sponsor are Joviflex and Durit.

Season to season

Squad
As of the 2008/09 season

Staff

Sports
Head Coach:
 Fernando Pereira
Assistant Coach:
 Coelho
Goalkeeper Coach:
 Zequinha
Medical Assistant:
 João Calisto

References

External links
AA Avanca official site 

Football clubs in Portugal
Association football clubs established in 1937
1937 establishments in Portugal